J. Wesley Brooks House (also known as the Scotch Cross House) is a historic house located two miles south of Greenwood, Greenwood County, South Carolina.

Description and history 
It was built in 1815, and is a two-story, white clapboard house on high brick supports in the Federal style with Palladian features. The house also has a portico in the Greek Revival style. The façade front features a double-tiered portico with pediment surmounting the second level portico.

It was listed on the National Register of Historic Places on March 30, 1973.

References

Houses on the National Register of Historic Places in South Carolina
Palladian Revival architecture in the United States
Federal architecture in South Carolina
Greek Revival houses in South Carolina
Houses completed in 1815
National Register of Historic Places in Greenwood County, South Carolina
Houses in Greenwood County, South Carolina
Buildings and structures in Greenwood, South Carolina